Moravský Krumlov is a town in Znojmo District in the South Moravian Region of the Czech Republic. It has about 5,600 inhabitants. The historic town centre is well preserved and is protected by law as an urban monument zone.

Administrative parts
Villages of Polánka, Rakšice and Rokytná are administrative parts of Moravský Krumlov.

Etymology
Krumlov is named after a meander of the Rokytná River. It has its origin in Middle High German Krumme Aue, which can be translated as crooked meadow. The adjective Moravský ("Moravian") was added in 1661 to differentiate it from Český Krumlov in Bohemia.

Geography
The municipal territory lies in three geomoprhological region. The central part with the town proper lies in the Boskovice Furrow. The western part extends into the Jevišovice Uplands. The Rokytná River flows through the town.

History

The foundation of the town is connected with the construction of a stone castle, which was probably initiated by order of Ottokar II of Bohemia. The first written mention about Moravský Krumlov is however from 1289. Between 1313 and 1315, the manor was acquired by the lords of Lipá. In 1354, an Augustinian monastery was founded here. In 1358, it was acquired by the lords of Kravaře.

During the Hussite Wars, the town was occupied by the Hussites and served as theirs military base. After the wars, the lords of Lipá regained the town. In the 16th century, the old castle was rebuilt into a comfortable Renaissance residence, and became a significant centre of cultural and social events. In 1622, the manor was acquired by the House of Liechtenstein. During the Thirty Years' War in 1645, the town was occupied by the Swedish army, which looted the town and devastated the castle.

During the Napoleonic Wars, Moravský Krumlov was twice occupied by Napoleon and his soldiers. The town recovered for a long time from the aftermath of the wars. During the first half of the 19th century, the town has lost its political, economic and cultural significance.

From the 1880s, ethnic conflicts began to escalate in Moravský Krumlov. The ethnic Germans formed about two thirds of the population. In 1908, the Kinsky family inherited the castle. In 1938, the majority of the Czech and Jewish population was forced to leave the town. On the last night of World War II (7 May 1945), the town was heavily bombed by Soviet air forces. As a result, three quarters of the town lay in ruins. The castle or the parish church were among the buildings that survived without major damage. In 1945, properties of the Kinsky family were confiscated and castle interiors were looted.

Demographics

Sights

The historic centre of Moravský Krumlov is located in a meander of the river Rokytná. In the 13th century, it was delimited by town walls. Several remnants of the town walls are preserved to this day.

Moravský Krumlov Castle is the main sight of the town. In 2016, the castle in poor condition was purchased by the town and is gradually being repaired. The complex of the Renaissance castle includes stables from 1593, a castle chapel from 1762, and a castle park established in the late 18th century. Until 2011, the castle was home to the series of paintings by Alphonse Mucha known as The Slav Epic. Since 2021, The Slav Epic has been again exhibited in the newly reconstructed part of the castle.

The monastery complex was destroyed by a large fire in 1682. It was reconstructed in the Baroque style in 1701, only several Gothic fragments of the church were preserved. The monastery was abolished in the late 18th century. Today it serves as a town hall. The monastery Church of Saint Bartholomew serves religious purposes to this day.

The parish Church of All Saints is the oldest religious building in the town. it was built in 1248 and originally consecrated to Saint Lawrence. After it was damaged during the Thirty Years' War, it was rebuilt in 1646. Baroque modifications were made in 1785. Next to the church is the Neoclassical tomb of the Liechtenstein family from 1789.

The Chapel of Saint Florian on a hill above the town is one of the landmarks of Moravský Krumlov. The Baroque chapel was built in 1697 and consecrated to patron saint of the town. Since 1989, it has been again a pilgrimage site.

Notable people
Jan IV of Pernštejn (1487–1548), nobleman
Vojtěch I of Pernštejn (1490–1534), nobleman
Heinrich Glücksmann (1864–1947), Austrian writer
Drahomíra Vihanová (1930–2017), film director, documentarian and screenwriter
Petr Málek (1961–2019), sport shooter, Olympic medalist
Vladimír Morávek (born 1965), film director, screenwriter and actor

Twin towns – sister cities

Moravský Krumlov is twinned with:
 Przeworsk, Poland

References

External links

Cities and towns in the Czech Republic
Populated places in Znojmo District